Cornelius is an unincorporated community in Jackson Township, Brown County, in the U.S. state of Indiana.

History
A post office was established at Cornelius in 1893, and remained in operation until it was discontinued in 1907. Cornelius was the name of a pioneer settler.

Geography

References

Unincorporated communities in Brown County, Indiana
Unincorporated communities in Indiana